Coeranus of Beroea was a Macedonian general of Alexander the Great, since the start of Asiatic expedition. Before the battle of Issus, when Harpalus fled to Greece, Alexander divided the control of the treasury between Coeranus and Philoxenus. Upon Harpalus' return to favor, Coeranus was appointed  financial officer for Phoenicia, Cilicia, and Coele-Syria. 

Arrian 3.12.4 calls the commander of the allied cavalry Coeranus. Possibly this is an error for Caranus.

References
Who's who in the age of Alexander the Great 

Generals of Alexander the Great
Ancient Beroeans